This article provides details on the candidates that stood at the 2008 Western Australian state election.

Retiring MPs
The following MPs did not contest the election.

Labor
 Kim Chance, MLC for Agricultural.
 Judy Edwards, MLA for Maylands.
 Nick Griffiths, MLC for East Metropolitan.
 Sheila McHale, MLA for Kenwick.
 Sheila Mills, MLC for South Metropolitan.
 Jaye Radisich, MLA for Swan Hills.
 Fred Riebeling, MLA for North West Coastal.

Liberal
 Matt Birney, MLA for Kalgoorlie.
 George Cash, MLC for North Metropolitan.
 Bruce Donaldson, MLC for Agricultural.
 Ray Halligan, MLC for North Metropolitan.
 Katie Hodson-Thomas, MLA for Carine.
 Barbara Scott, MLC for South Metropolitan.

Independent
 Shelley Archer, MLC for Mining and Pastoral (last elected as a Labor candidate).
 Bob Kucera, MLA for Yokine (last elected as a Labor candidate).
 Paul Omodei, MLA for Warren-Blackwood (last elected as a Liberal candidate).

Legislative Assembly
Incumbent members are shown in bold text. Successful candidates are highlighted in the relevant colour.

Legislative Council

Six candidates are elected in each region. Incumbent members listed in bold. Tickets that elected at least one MLC are highlighted in the relevant colour. Successful candidates are identified by an asterisk (*).

Agricultural Region

East Metropolitan Region

Mining and Pastoral Region

North Metropolitan Region

South Metropolitan Region

South West Region

References

External links
 WAEC candidate list - Legislative Assembly
 WAEC candidate list - Legislative Council
 ABC Election site

2008 elections in Australia
Candidates for Western Australian state elections